Geographic Number Portability Unbundled Line Metallic Path or GLUMP is a product related to Local Loop Unbundling (LLU) in the Republic of Ireland.  Geographic Number Portability (GNP) is the process of a user moving their number to a new address. Local Loop Unbundling (LLU) is the process of a line being used by a 3rd party to provide a service on the incumbent's exchange or line. Comreg (The Irish Communications Regulator) and eircom, the incumbent telecom company, have named the combination GLUMP.

Local Loop Unbundling (LLU) is the better known process of a third party using the "last mile" Copper. GLUMP is a variation on this where a subscriber to a 3rd party for LLU based broadband may keep their existing number or even the analogue phone service from the incumbent. Normally the phone number and analogue line is lost on getting a LLU based product.

In the last revision of GLUMP (assisted by Comreg) 2007 only Magnet Networks was availing of this eircom product and by late 2007 even Magnet was making little use as they concentrate on offering their triple-play (Phone, Broadband and TV) via fibre. 

Number Portability (NP) is defined as a right for the Irish user by Comreg; however, while porting a number between Mobile Phone Operators takes less than an hour, porting an eircom fixed line number can take days to months even if GLUMP is not involved. GLUMP is not required to port an existing number to a non-eircom connection, such as VOIP or phone service provided via fibre, cable or Metro Microwave.

History
GLUMP was developed in 2006. The Irish Information Technology news wire reported at the time:

Investment
Investors have been warned about the risks of investing in this, or any other telecommunications securities, under Ireland's Blue Sky Law.

References

Telecommunications in the Republic of Ireland
Science and technology in the Republic of Ireland